Picard Lakes is a group of lakes in Clearwater County, Minnesota, in the United States.

Picard Lakes were named for Antoine Auguelle Picard du Gay, a French explorer.

See also
List of lakes in Minnesota

References

Lakes of Minnesota
Lakes of Clearwater County, Minnesota